The Sugar Water Festival was a music festival founded by American recording artists Erykah Badu, Queen Latifah and Jill Scott. The trek played to amphitheaters and arenas in the United States during the summer of 2005 and 2006. It began in 2005 as an event to bring awareness to health issues to African-American women. British duo Floetry opened shows during the 2005 run. The festival was relaunched briefly in 2006 with Kelis opening the show and comedian Mo'Nique hosting the festival. 2006 was the final year for the outing. The festival had plans to expand into Europe and Asia, however, this did not come to fruition.

Background
The festival was announced in May 2005. Forming the "Suger Water Festival, LLC, the trek was headlined by Badu, Latifah and Scott.  The singers stated performing Lilith Fair was the inspiration for the outing—with each singer wanting to bring a specific message to African American women. The festival was planned within six months, not providing enough times to gain notable sponsors. Badu says the meaning behind the name is the symbolism of "water" to "Earth", as the planet is three-fourths water. She continues to say women are the sweetness to the water, giving them the name of the tour."

To introduce the shows, Badu stated:

Opening acts
Floetry (2005)
Kelis (2006)

Set list
 For the 2005 outing, the set list included an opening performance by, Scott, Latifah and Badu performing "Night's Over Egypt" and closing finale, "Never Too Much" as a tribute to R&B/soul singer Luther Vandross.
{{hidden
| headercss = background: #ccccff; font-size: 100%; width: 70%;
| contentcss = text-align: left; font-size: 100%; width: 80%;
| header = 2005 
| content =
"Nights Over Egypt"
Queen Latifah
"Baby Get Lost"
"Hard Times"
"Hello Stranger"
"The Same Love That Made Me Laugh"
"California Dreamin'"
"Simply Beautiful"
"Latifah's Had it up 2 Here"
"Just Another Day..."
"Ladies First"
"U.N.I.T.Y."
Jill Scott
"Golden"
"The Way"
"Do You Remember"
"Gettin' In the Way"
"Cross My Mind"
"A Long Walk"
"Whatever"
"He Loves Me (Lyzel In E Flat)"
Erykah Badu
"Rimshot (Intro)" (Instrumental Interlude)
"Green Eyes"
"Didn't Cha Know?"
"Cleva"
"Orange Moon"
"Love of My Life (An Ode to Hip-Hop)"
"Otherside of the Game"
"Danger"
Medley: "On & On" / "...& On"
"Back in the Day (Puff)"
"Bag Lady"
Encore
"Never Too Much"
}}
{{hidden
| headercss = background: #ccccff; font-size: 100%; width: 70%;
| contentcss = text-align: left; font-size: 100%; width: 80%;
| header = 2006
| content =
Jill Scott
"Exclusively"
"The Way
"Cross My Mind"
"Bedda at Home"
"Whatever"
"A Long Walk"
"Golden"
"The Fact Is (I Need You)"
"He Loves Me (Lyzel In E Flat)"
Queen Latifah
"Mercy, Mercy, Mercy"
"If I Had You"
"California Dreamin'"
"Simply Beautiful"
"Lush Life"
"A Good Woman"
"Just Another Day..."
"Come into My House"
"Ladies First"
"U.N.I.T.Y."
Erykah Badu
"I Want You"
Medley: "On & On" / "...& On"
"Next Lifetime"
"Tyrone"
"Back in the Day (Puff)"
"Otherside of the Game"
"Kiss Me on My Neck (Hesi)"
"Cleva"
"Green Eyes"
"Love of My Life (An Ode to Hip-Hop)" (contains elements of "Rapper's Delight")
"Danger"
"Bag Lady"
}}

Tour dates

Additional notes
During the August 13, 2006 show in Columbia, Maryland, Scott along with Latifah and MoNique performed with Badu on her closing finale, "Bag Lady".

References

Music festivals in the United States
2005 concert tours
2006 concert tours
Erykah Badu concert tours
Jill Scott (singer) concert tours